Josef Vojta (19 April 1935 – 6 March 2023) was a Czechoslovak football player.

Career
His youth football career started in FK Ústí nad Labem. During his professional club career he played most of the time (1960–1968) for Sparta Prague in Czechoslovak First League. Between 1960 and 1968 he made 351 league appearances and scored 77 goals from his position of midfielder. He earned 13 caps and scored 3 goals for the Czechoslovakia national team, and was part of the bronze team at the UEFA Euro 1960, and also won a silver medal in Football at the 1964 Summer Olympics. Vojta was famous for his hard style of playing – he was the "hardest footballer" in the 1960s in Czechoslovakia. And also, he was famous for his versatility, because his position on field could be attacker or midfielder same as defender. After leaving Sparta Prague in 1968, he played in FK Chomutov, FK Meteor Prague and other smaller Czech football clubs. He ended up with his professional career in the end of 1970s. Vojta still played football for Formal Sparta Prague players team. In 2010, he was elected to Sparta Prague Hall of Fame.

Honours
Sparta Prague
 Czechoslovak First League: 1964–65, 1966–67
 Czechoslovak Cup: 1964
 Mitropa Cup: 1964

Czechoslovakia
 UEFA Euro 1960: Bronze medal
 1964 Summer Olympics: Silver medal

References

External links
 
 
 Interview with Josef Vojta (Czech)
 
 

1935 births
2023 deaths
Czech footballers
Czechoslovak footballers
Czechoslovakia international footballers
Olympic footballers of Czechoslovakia
Olympic silver medalists for Czechoslovakia
Olympic medalists in football
Footballers at the 1964 Summer Olympics
Medalists at the 1964 Summer Olympics
1960 European Nations' Cup players
AC Sparta Prague players
Sportspeople from Plzeň
Association football midfielders
FK Ústí nad Labem players